Ronald Whittaker (born August 12, 1971) is an American professional golfer.

Whittaker was born in Raleigh, North Carolina. He was a semi-finalist in the 1988 U.S. Junior Amateur. He played college golf at Wake Forest University where he won once. He turned professional in 1995.

Whittaker played on the Sunshine Tour in 1995, winning the FNB Players Championship and finishing 11th on the Order of Merit. He played on the PGA Tour and Nationwide Tour from 1996 to 1998 and again from 2006 to 2012. On the PGA Tour (1996, 2006, 2008), his best finish was T-9 at the 2006 Frys.com Open. On the Nationwide Tour (1997–98, 2007, 2009–12), he won the 2007 Chattanooga Classic. He played on mini-tours, including the Gateway Tour and Tight Lies Tour between his stints on the PGA/Nationwide Tours, winning several events. 

Whittaker is the nephew of PGA Tour golfer Lanny Wadkins.

Professional wins (2)

Sunshine Tour wins (1)

Nationwide Tour wins (1)

Nationwide Tour playoff record (0–1)

See also
1995 PGA Tour Qualifying School graduates
2005 PGA Tour Qualifying School graduates
2007 Nationwide Tour graduates

References

External links

American male golfers
Wake Forest Demon Deacons men's golfers
PGA Tour golfers
Korn Ferry Tour graduates
Golfers from Raleigh, North Carolina
Golfers from Arkansas
Sportspeople from Little Rock, Arkansas
1971 births
Living people